The Gettysburg Bullets men's lacrosse team represents Gettysburg College in National Collegiate Athletic Association (NCAA) Division III men's lacrosse.

History
Gettysburg currently competes as a member of the Centennial Conference and plays their home games at Musselman Stadium.

During the NCAA era, Gettysburg has made 26 NCAA tournament appearances, with 11 Final Fours and 3 tournament runner-ups.

Gettysburg closest run at a championship was the 2009 national title game where they lost a close game to SUNY Cortland 9 to 7.

The Bullets have had 33 consecutive winning seasons, stretching from 1987 to 2020.

Season Results
The following is a list of Gettysburg's results by season as an NCAA Division III program during the NCAA era which began in 1974.

{| class="wikitable"

|- align="center"

†NCAA canceled 2020 collegiate activities due to the COVID-19 virus.

See also
Lacrosse in Pennsylvania

References

External links
 Gettysburg Official Site
 Youtube 1961 Franklin & Marshall Men's Lacrosse at Gettysburg

College men's lacrosse teams in the United States
1958 establishments in Pennsylvania
Lacrosse clubs established in 1958